Koniuji Island is one of the Andreanof Islands subgroup of the Aleutian Islands of southwestern Alaska, United States. It lies northwest of Atka Island and east of Kasatochi Island. The name "Koniuji" is derived from  "auklet", bestowed by Russian sailors in reference to the endemic seabirds. The Aleut name is  "the big made island", in reference to putative recent volcanic activity. 

Koniuji Island is the emergent top of a mostly submarine stratovolcano. Little is known of the geologic history of this volcano. Reports of recent eruptive activity may be erroneous and are considered to refer to eruptions of Kasatochi volcano to the west. The last eruption of Koniuji Island was around 3,000 years ago, in approximately 1150 BC.

The slope up from the south side is grass covered. An extensive kelp patch extends from the south of the island. Also, in the summer, heavy kelp is found along and well off the western shore.

Koniuji Island provides nesting habitat for close to 300,000 seabirds. Around 70% are Fork-tailed Storm-petrels and 17% are Leach's Storm-petrel. There are also large numbers of the Ancient Murrelet and the Whiskered Auklet that nest on Koniuji. These four species breed on Koniuji Island in numbers that exceed 1% of their total global populations.

A 1998 survey found these birds on Koniuji during the breeding season:

References

Koniuji Island: Block 1106, Census Tract 1, Aleutians West Census Area, Alaska United States Census Bureau

External links
 Koniuji Island Photos Photos from Koniuji Island, July 2008

Andreanof Islands
Uninhabited islands of Alaska
Islands of Alaska
Islands of Unorganized Borough, Alaska
Holocene stratovolcanoes
Volcanoes of Alaska
Stratovolcanoes of the United States
Volcanic islands
Pleistocene stratovolcanoes